was one of the administrative divisions of Taiwan during the Japanese rule. The prefecture consisted of modern-day Tainan City, Chiayi City, Chiayi County and Yunlin County.

Population

Administrative divisions

Cities and districts
In 1945 (Shōwa 20), there were 2 cities and 10 districts.

Towns and Villages
The districts are divided into towns (街) and villages (庄)

See also
Political divisions of Taiwan (1895–1945)
Governor-General of Taiwan
Taiwan under Japanese rule
Administrative divisions of Taiwan
Tainan Prefecture (Qing dynasty)

Former prefectures of Japan in Taiwan
History of Tainan